Turris spectabilis is a species of sea snail, a marine gastropod mollusk in the family Turridae, the turrids.

Description
(Original description) The spotting is of a more numerous and miscellaneous character in this species than in any of the genus, though it presents in certain respects a modification of that in Turris garnonsii (Reeve, 1843). The dusky band which girds the lower portion of the whorls in that species is exhibited both round the lower and upper portions in this, and the number of spots is apparently doubled in like manner. The siphonal canal is short, and presents a great peculiarity of character.

Distribution
This marine species occurs off the Philippines.

References

 Kilburn R.N., Fedosov A.E. & Olivera B.M. (2012) Revision of the genus Turris Batsch, 1789 (Gastropoda: Conoidea: Turridae) with the description of six new species. Zootaxa 3244: 1-58.
 Drivas, J. & Jay, M. (1988). Coquillages de La Réunion et de l'Île Maurice. Collection les beautés de la nature. Delachaux et Niestlé: Neuchâtel. ISBN 2-603-00654-1. pp. 1-160.

External links
 Reeve, L. A. (1843-1846). Monograph of the genus Pleurotoma. In: Conchologia Iconica, or, illustrations of the shells of molluscous animals, vol. 1, pl. 1-40 and unpaginated text. L. Reeve & Co., London

spectabilis
Gastropods described in 1843